Jenny Holl (born 13 September 1999) is a Scottish professional racing cyclist. Originally from Scotland, Holl moved to Manchester in 2017.

In January 2018, Holl became Scotland's youngest national champion, at the British Track Cycling Championships. In June 2019, at the European Games in Minsk, Holl won a silver medal in the team pursuit event.

She won the bronze medal in the individual pursuit at the 2020 Summer Paralympics alongside Sophie Unwin before taking silver in the Road Race B.

References

External links
 

1999 births
Living people
Scottish female cyclists
Place of birth missing (living people)
Cyclists at the 2019 European Games
European Games medalists in cycling
European Games silver medalists for Great Britain
Cyclists at the 2020 Summer Paralympics
21st-century Scottish women